The flowering plant genus Ipheion (starflower, spring starflower) belongs to Allioideae, a subfamily of the family Amaryllidaceae. The World Checklist of Selected Plant Families no longer recognize the genus, regarding it as a synonym of Tristagma, although The Plant List accepts two species.

Description 
They are small bulbous perennials with narrow grass-like leaves and honey-scented star-shaped flowers in spring, usually in shades of white or pale blue. The genus occurs naturally in Argentina, Uruguay, and southern Brazil, although Ipheion uniflorum has naturalized elsewhere.

Taxonomy

History 
The genus was originally described in 1836 by Constantine Samuel Rafinesque, based on Ipheion uniflorum, separating it from  Milla uniflora Graham (now Tristagma). The original description was unifloral inflorescences with white flowers, spathe formed by one bifid bract, staminal filaments independently fused to the perigonial tube and the fruit being a clavate trilocular capsule.

The name then disappeared for more than a century and at various times the species have been included under other related genera (Milla, Tristagma, Brodiaea (including Hookera), Leucocoryne, Nothoscordum, Triteleia and Beauverdia). Several of these genera are now in a completely different but related family (Themidaceae). The closest of these genera to Ipheion is actually Tristagma. For instance in 1837, at the same time as Rafinesque's description, Ipheion uniflorum was described by John Lindley in the Botanical Register as  Triteleia uniflora Lindl. (see illustration)

In 1908, Beauverd placed Ipheion uniflorum in a new section of Nothoscordum, Nothoscordum section uniflora Beauv. as Nothoscordum uniflorum Baker (without attributing Rafinesque), along with four other species. However the name Ipheion did not appear again until 1943. In that year Herter elevated  Nothoscordum section uniflora to the rank of genus, as Beauverdia. Later that same year Stearn pointed out that the name Ipheion had precedence and described the genus with nine species under that name.

There has been constant uncertainty as to the limits of the genus. At one stage it included 23 species in two sections, at other times it was completely absorbed into other genera such as Tristagma. Those species with yellow flowers were returned to Nothoscordum. In 1972 Guaglianone separated it again from Tristagma and divided it into two sections, Hirtellum and Ipheion. At that time it consisted of eight species in Argentina, Uruguay, southern Brazil and central Chile.

Familial circumscription 
Lindley included Ipheion (as Triteleia) under the family Liliaceae, a pattern that remained until 1926, when Hutchinson moved parts of that family to Amaryllidaceae, as tribe Gilesieae, an arrangement that has largely persisted since.

Phylogenetics 
In 1996, a molecular phylogenetic study of the rbcL gene created the Gilliesioideae, as one of three subfamilies within Alliaceae. As phylogenetically constructed, Gilliesioideae (Gilliesioideae (Lindl.) Am., Botany: 134. 1832 - Gilliesieae Lindl. in Bot. Reg.: ad t. 992. 1826.) consisted of those New World Alliaceae not included in the other two subfamilies, which included both the former Gilliesieae together with Ipheion, Leucocoryne, Nothoscordum, and Tristagma. This is the circumscription which the Angiosperm Phylogeny Group (APG) accepted in the APG classification of 1998 and which later became known as Alliaceae sensu stricto (s.s.).

This construction of Gilliesioideae, implicitly recognised that it was composed of two groups or tribes, informally referred to as Ipheieae and Gilliesieae. The Ipheieae were actinomorphic, and included Ipheion, Nothoscordum, Leucocoryne s.l. (including Pabellonia and Stemmatium). Further phylogenetic analysis revealed that Ipheion was not monophyletic but rather biphyletic with some species clustering with Tristagma, and others with Nothoscordum (Fay 2006) although the division into sections was later supported. Research published in 2010 suggests that although related to genera such as Tristagma and Nothoscordum, it is a distinct genus of 3 species. However, other sources do not recognize the genus, placing all the Ipheion species in Tristagma.

Ipheion section Hirtellum was raised to genus rank in 2014 under the older name of Beauverdia, with four species found in Argentina, southern Brazil, and Uruguay. This corresponds to Group 3 of Sassone et al. 2013. This leaves Ipheion section Ipheion  representing the genus, but further work is required. This cluster (Group 2 in the cladistic analysis of Sassone et al. 2013) which clusters with Tristagma may either be an independent genus, or a section of the latter genus. These are the three species listed here.

Species
 Ipheion sessile, syn. Ipheion recurvifolium, Tristagma sessile
 Ipheion tweedieanum, syn. Tristagma tweedianum
 Ipheion uniflorum, syn. Tristagma uniflorum - spring starflower

Species formerly placed in this genus
Other species formerly placed in Ipheion have been transferred to Beauverdia, Nothoscordum or Tristagma:
 Ipheion ameghinoi (Speg.) Traub = Tristagma ameghinoi (Speg.) Speg.
 Ipheion bivalve (Hook. ex Lindl.) Traub = Tristagma bivalve (Hook. ex Lindl.) Traub
 Ipheion brevipes (Kuntze) Traub = Tristagma brevipes (Kuntze) Traub
 Ipheion circinatum (Sandwith) Traub = Tristagma circinatum (Sandwith) Traub
 Ipheion dialystemon Guagl. = Nothoscordum dialystemon (Guagl.) Crosa
 Ipheion felipponei (Beauverd) Traub = Beauverdia sellowiana (Kunth) Herter
 Ipheion gracile (Phil.) Traub = Tristagma gracile (Phil.) Traub
 Ipheion hirtellum (Kunth) Traub = Beauverdia hirtella (Kunth) Herter
 Ipheion lloydiiflorum (Beauverd) Traub = Beauverdia vittata (Griseb.) Herter
 Ipheion lorentzii (Herter) Traub = Beauverdia lorentzii Herter
 Ipheion nivale (Poepp.) Traub = Tristagma nivale Poepp.
 Ipheion patagonicum (Baker) Traub = Tristagma patagonicum (Baker) Traub
 Ipheion poeppigianum (Gay) Traub = Tristagma poeppigianum (Gay) Traub
 Ipheion porrifolium (Poepp.) Traub = Tristagma porrifolium (Poepp.) Traub
 Ipheion recurvifolium (C.H.Wright) Traub = Tristagma sessile (Phil.) Traub
 Ipheion sellowianum (Kunth) Traub = Beauverdia sellowiana (Kunth) Herter
 Ipheion setaceum (Baker) Traub = Nothoscordum setaceum (Baker) Ravenna
 Ipheion spegazzinii (Macloskie) Traub = Tristagma patagonicum (Baker) Traub
 Ipheion subsessile (Beauverd) Traub = Beauverdia hirtella (Kunth) Herter
 Ipheion violaceum (Kunth) Traub = Tristagma bivalve (Hook. ex Lindl.) Traub
 Ipheion viridius (Killip) Traub = Tristagma patagonicum (Baker) Traub
 Ipheion vittatum (Griseb.) Traub = Beauverdia vittata (Griseb.) Herter

Uses 
Ipheion uniflorum is widely used as an ornamental garden plant in the Americas, Africa, Australia and Europe.

References

Bibliography

General

Systematics

Ipheion

Related genera 
 
 
 
 

Amaryllidaceae genera
Flora of South America
Allioideae
Taxa named by Constantine Samuel Rafinesque